Le vicomte Gilles de Robien (born 10 April 1941) is a French politician and former government minister.

The son of Count Jean de Robien by his wife Éliane Le Mesre de Pas, he is descended from the noble Breton family de Robien.

In 1989, De Robien was elected Mayor of Amiens, being re-elected for two further terms. However, in the French municipal elections of 2008, he was defeated by Gilles Demailly of the French Socialist Party.

De Robien served as French Minister for Education from August 2005 to May 2007, and as a Deputy from 1996 to 2007.

Political career 
Government offices

Minister for Transport : 2002–2005.

Minister for National Education : 2005–2007.

Electoral mandates

National Assembly of France

Vice-President of the National Assembly of France : 1993–1998.

Member of the National Assembly of France for the Somme : 1986–2002 (appointed Minister in 2002). Elected in 1986 (re-elected: 1988, 1993, 1997, 2002).

Regional Council

Regional Councillor of Picardy : 1992–2004. Re-elected in 1998.

Municipal Council

Mayor of Amiens : 1989–2002 (Resigned) / 2007–2008. Re-elected in 1995, 2001, 2007.

Deputy Mayor of Amiens : 2002–2007.

City Councillor of Amiens : 1989–2008. Re-elected in 1995, 2001.

Agglomeration Community Council

President of the Communauté d'agglomération Amiens Métropole : 1994–2008. Re-elected in 1995, 2001.

Member of the Communauté d'agglomération Amiens Métropole : 1994–2008. Re-elected in 1995, 2001.

Honours 
  Chevalier, Légion d'honneur
  Commandeur, Order of Palmes académiques
  Honorary Knight Commander of the Order of the British Empire (Hon. KBE)
  Grand Officer, Ordem Nacional do Cruzeiro do Sul (Brasil)
  Grand Cross, Orden al Mérito de Chile
  Grand Cross, Orden del Mérito Civil (España)
  Knight Grand Cross, Ordine al merito della Repubblica Italiana
  Grand Officer, Order of Ouissam Alaouite (Morocco)

References

 

1941 births
Living people
Union for French Democracy politicians
People from Somme (department)
Politicians of the French Fifth Republic
Transport ministers of France
French Ministers of National Education
French nobility
Chevaliers of the Légion d'honneur
Honorary Knights Commander of the Order of the British Empire
Lycée Hoche alumni
Mayors of places in Hauts-de-France